Ryan Thomas Meisinger (born May 4, 1994) is an American professional baseball player. He is pitcher for the Long Island Ducks of the Atlantic League of Professional Baseball. He previously played in Major League Baseball (MLB) for the Baltimore Orioles, St. Louis Cardinals, and the Chicago Cubs.

Amateur career
Meisinger attended Northern High School in Owings, Maryland. After graduating high school, he attended Radford University where he played college baseball for the Radford Highlanders. As a junior in 2015, he had a 5–0 win–loss record with a 1.62 earned run average (ERA).

Professional career

Baltimore Orioles
The Orioles selected Meisinger in the 11th round of the 2015 MLB draft, and he signed. He made his professional debut with the GCL Orioles, and after one scoreless inning in which he struck out the side, he was promoted to the Aberdeen IronBirds where he finished the year with a 1.99 ERA in  relief innings pitched. In 2016, he pitched for the Delmarva Shorebirds and Frederick Keys where he was 6–4 with a 1.57 ERA in  relief innings pitched between both teams, and in 2017, he played with the Bowie Baysox where he pitched to a 4–3 record and 3.00 ERA in 63 innings pitched out of the bullpen. He began 2018 with Bowie and was promoted to the Norfolk Tides in May.

Meisinger was promoted to the major leagues on June 29, 2018, and he made his major league debut that same night, pitching  innings in relief in which he gave up one run on two hits, striking out one.

St. Louis Cardinals
On December 10, 2018, Meisinger was claimed off waivers by the St. Louis Cardinals.

Meisinger was designated for assignment by the Cardinals on December 21, 2018 to make room on their 40-man roster for Andrew Miller. He cleared waivers and was outrighted to the Memphis Redbirds.

On August 17, 2020, Meisinger was selected to the active roster. Meisinger was designated for assignment by the Cardinals on September 8, 2020. In his time in the majors in 2020, Meisinger pitched  scoreless innings, allowing only one hit and four walks while striking out three. Meisinger elected free agency on October 5, 2020.

Chicago Cubs
On March 1, 2021, Meisinger signed a minor league contract with the Chicago Cubs organization. On May 9, he pitched the ninth inning of a no-hitter against the Indianapolis Indians at Principal Park in Des Moines, Iowa. Preceded on the mound by Shelby Miller, Tommy Nance, and Brad Wieck, he completed the combined no-hit game and earned a save. On August 12, 2021, Meisinger's contract was selected by the Cubs. Meisinger made seven appearances for the Cubs, struggling to a 12.27 ERA with six strikeouts. On August 28, he was designated for assignment by the Cubs.

Los Angeles Dodgers
On August 31, Meisinger was claimed off of waivers by the Los Angeles Dodgers. He spent one day on the major league roster before being optioned to AAA Oklahoma City without appearing in a game. He was outrighted off the 40-man roster on September 5. In AAA, he allowed only one earned run in  innings over 10 games for a 1.69 ERA. On October 8, Meisinger elected free agency.

Arizona Diamondbacks
On March 22, 2022, Meisinger signed a minor league deal with the Arizona Diamondbacks. He was released on May 24, 2022.

Long Island Ducks
On June 3, 2022, Meisinger signed with the Long Island Ducks of the Atlantic League of Professional Baseball.

References

External links

1994 births
Living people
People from Prince Frederick, Maryland
Baseball players from Maryland
Major League Baseball pitchers
Aberdeen IronBirds players
Baltimore Orioles players
Bowie Baysox players
Chicago Cubs players
Delmarva Shorebirds players
Frederick Keys players
Gulf Coast Orioles players
Iowa Cubs players
Long Island Ducks players
Memphis Redbirds players
Norfolk Tides players
Oklahoma City Dodgers players
Radford Highlanders baseball players
Salt River Rafters players
St. Louis Cardinals players